Three Days to Vegas is a 2007 American comedy film directed by Charlie Picerni and starring Peter Falk, Rip Torn, George Segal,  and Bill Cobbs. The story follows four elderly male retirees who take a road trip to Las Vegas to stop the impending marriage of one of their daughters, played by Nancy Young. Cobbs replaced iconic actor Ossie Davis in the cast after Davis died during production. The film features various prominent actors in supporting roles, including Billy Burke, Chris Diamantopoulos, Reginald VelJohnson, and Taylor Negron.

Cast
Peter Falk as Gus 'Fitzy' Fitzgerald
Rip Torn as Joe Wallace
George Segal as Dominic Spinuzzi
Bill Cobbs as Marvin Jeffries
Billy Burke as Billy
Nancy Young as Elizabeth Fitzgerald
Chris Diamantopoulos as Laurent Perrier
Taylor Negron as Antoine
Mario Cantone as Chris
Coolio as The Flow
Charlie Murphy as Andre
Reginald VelJohnson as RJ Jackson
Xavier Truesdell as Flo's Entourage

References

External links
 

2007 films
American comedy films
Films set in the Las Vegas Valley
Films shot in the Las Vegas Valley
2007 comedy films
2000s American films